Rdutów may refer to the following villages in Poland:
Rdutów, Greater Poland Voivodeship (west-central Poland)
Rdutów, Łódź Voivodeship (central Poland)